Old Main, Suomi College is an educational building located on Quincy Street on the Finlandia University campus in Hancock, Michigan.  It is also known as the Suomi College Building.  It was designated a Michigan State Historic Site in 1959 and listed on the National Register of Historic Places in 1972.

History 

In the late 1800s, large numbers of Finns settled in Hancock, drawn by the jobs in mining and lumber.  One of those immigrants was J. K. Nikander, a pastor of the Finnish Evangelical Lutheran Church of America (commonly known as the Suomi Synod).  Nikander wanted to ensure that Finnish Lutheran ministers would be available in America, staving off the loss of Finnish identity in the population.  In 1896, Nikander founded a new institution, Suomi College.  Suomi's mission was to train Lutheran ministers and to teach English.

The first building of Suomi College was Old Main; it was constructed using plans drawn by architect Charles Archibald Pearce. The firm of Bajari & Ulseth was contracted to perform the carpentry work, and William Scott for the stonework.  The total cost of the building was $40,000. The cornerstone of the building was laid on May 30, 1898 and the building was dedicated on January 21, 1900.

Suomi quickly outgrew Old Main, and an additional frame building housing a gym, meeting hall and music center was constructed in 1901.  In the 1920s, Suomi's mission shifted and it became primarily a liberal arts college.  In 1958, the seminary separated from the rest of the college.  In 2000, Suomi changed its name to Finlandia University.

Description 
Old Main is a three-story Richardsonian Romanesque building constructed from rough Jacobsville sandstone, which was quarried at the Portage Entry of the Keweenaw waterway.  It has a gabled roof with wall dormers. The main entrance is surmounted by an arch, with a large bay window and tower above. Heavy buttresses divide the windows and support the tower.  The rear is relatively devoid of ornamentation.  The building originally contained everything required for the young college: a dormitory, kitchen, and laundry, as well as classrooms, offices, a library, chapel and lounge.  As Suomi changed, Old Main has been used for multiple purposes; however, little alteration of the exterior was required.  As of 2009, the building houses administrative offices such as Financial Aid, Admissions, and the Office of Student Accounts.

References

Buildings and structures in Houghton County, Michigan
University and college buildings on the National Register of Historic Places in Michigan
Michigan State Historic Sites in Houghton County
Sandstone buildings in the United States
School buildings completed in 1900
Richardsonian Romanesque architecture in Michigan
Finlandia University
National Register of Historic Places in Houghton County, Michigan
University and college administration buildings in the United States
University and college buildings completed in 1900
Hancock, Michigan
1900 establishments in Michigan